Stowmarket was a parliamentary constituency centred on the town of Stowmarket in Suffolk.  It returned one Member of Parliament (MP) to the House of Commons of the Parliament of the United Kingdom, elected by the first past the post voting system.

History
The North-Western or Stowmarket Division was one of five single-member county divisions of the Parliamentary County of Suffolk created by the Redistribution of Seats Act 1885 to replace the existing two 2-member divisions for the 1885 general election. It was formed from parts of the Western Division of Suffolk and included the towns of Stowmarket and Newmarket. It was abolished by the Representation of the People Act 1918 when the majority of the Division was absorbed into the new Bury St Edmunds Division of West Suffolk, with a small area in the east, including Stowmarket itself, transferred to the Eye Division of East Suffolk.

Boundaries
The Municipal Borough of Bury St Edmunds, the Sessional Divisions of Blackbourn, Lackford, and Stowmarket, parts of the Sessional Divisions of Newmarket, Thedwestry, and Thingoe, and the part of the Municipal Borough of Thetford in the county of Suffolk.

As Bury St Edmunds formed a separate Parliamentary Borough, only non-resident freeholders of the Borough were entitled to vote in this constituency.

Members of Parliament

Elections

Elections in the 1880s

Elections in the 1890s 
Green's death caused a by-election.

Elections in the 1900s

Elections in the 1910s 

General Election 1914–15:

Another General Election was required to take place before the end of 1915. The political parties had been making preparations for an election to take place and by the July 1914, the following candidates had been selected; 
Unionist: Frank Goldsmith
Liberal: E. R. Hollond

References

Parliamentary constituencies in Suffolk (historic)
Constituencies of the Parliament of the United Kingdom established in 1885
Constituencies of the Parliament of the United Kingdom disestablished in 1918
Stowmarket